Prospect is a residential locality in the local government area (LGA) of Launceston in the Launceston LGA region of Tasmania. The 2016 census recorded a population of 1722 for the state suburb of Prospect.
It is a suburb of Launceston.

The Mount Pleasant Laboratories are Tasmanian government laboratories located in Prospect and include:
 Diagnostic Services - Researching the Tasmanian devil facial tumor disease
 Animal Health Laboratory
 Water Microbiology Laboratory
 Veterinary Pathology and Fish Microbiology
 Seed Laboratory and Certification

A sawmill, stonemason, Tasmanian Independent Retailers state distribution centre dominate the area. There are a number of restaurants and shops along Westbury Road - Prospect's main commercial corridor - including Supa IGA. The Silverdome Complex is a multi use facility incorporating an indoor cycling track, netball courts and concert seating. The home of the Tasmanian Institute of Sport Offices.

History 
Prospect was gazetted as a locality in 1963.

Geography
The Midland Highway forms most of the eastern boundary.

Road infrastructure 
National Route 1 (Midland Highway) runs through the north-east corner, and the Bass Highway runs through to the west.

References

Suburbs of Launceston, Tasmania
Localities of City of Launceston